David Robert Powell (born 24 September 1967) is an English former professional footballer who played as a goalkeeper. He made appearances in the English Football League with West Bromwich Albion and also on loan at Wrexham.

He is the youngest goalkeeper to have played a competitive first-team match for West Bromwich Albion, playing as a late replacement for Paul Bradshaw against Crystal Palace in the short-lived Full Members Cup on 23 October 1985 at the age of 18 years and 29 days.

He retired in 1988 after leaving West Bromwich Albion.

References

1967 births
Living people
English footballers
Association football goalkeepers
West Bromwich Albion F.C. players
Wrexham A.F.C. players
English Football League players